The Deadly Breaking Sword is a 1979 Hong Kong wuxia film directed by Sun Chung and starring Ti Lung and Alexander Fu Sheng.

Plot
Warrior Tuan Changqing (Ti Lung) meets courtesan Liu Yinxi (Shih Szu) in a small town. Liu pleads Tuan to kill underworld master Guo Tiansheng (Ku Feng), known as the "Killer Doctor", in oder to avenge the death of her fiancé. Tuan and casino security guard Xiao Dao (Alexander Fu Sheng) breaks into Guo's household and triggering the battle of good against evil.

Cast
Ti Lung as Tuan Changqing, the Deadly Breaking Sword
Alexander Fu Sheng as Xiao Dao
Shih Szu as Liu Yinxu
Ku Feng as Dr. Guo Tiansheng, the Killer Doctor
Michael Chan as Lian San, the Throat Piercing Halberd
Lily Li as Luo Jinhua
Shum Lo as Boss Luo
Chan Shen as Officer Fan Fei
Ngai Fei as Chen Yinggang
Teresa Ha as Madam Li Xing
Kara Hui as Xiaoqin
Keung Hon as Dr. Guo's hanger-on
Eddy Ko as Dr. Guo's hanger-on
Ng Hong-sang as Dr. Guo's hanger-on
Yuen Wah as Dr. Guo's hanger-on
Chow Kin-ping as Dr. Guo's hanger-on
Austin Wai as Sword Spirits Duo (red)
Yuen Bun as Sword Spirits Duo (gold)
Cheung Kwok-wa as Diao Qi
Lam Fai-wong as Troublemaker at the casino
Jamie Luk as Troublemaker at the casino
Wong Ching-ho as Conman
Ting Tung as Prison Guard
Tang Wai-ho as Prison guard
Cheung Hei as Innkeeper
Man Man as Inn waiter
Wong Kung-miu as Inn waiter
Fong Yue as Prostitute
Sai Gwa-pau as Brothel worker
Kam Tin-chue as Brothel guest
Tony Lee as Gambler
Tam Wai-man as Casino bouncer
Lam Chi-tai as Prison guard
Robert Mak as Prison guard
Wong Chi-ming as Prison guard
Hung Ling-ling as Prostitute
Lui Hung as Prostitute
Alan Chan

Theme song
True Colors of a Beautiful Hero (美雄本色)  / Beauty Renowned to the World (五湖四海美名揚) 
Composer: Joseph Koo
Lyricist: Sun Yi
Singer: Jenny Tseng

Reception

Critical
Ian Jane of DVD Talk gave the film a positive review and writes "The film might seem a little dated considering that it came out in the mid-eighties, past the genre's prime by a bit of a margin, but it stands as a good example of how fun and exciting a well made Shaw Brothers swordplay could be when delivered by a dedicated director and a talented cast."

Box office
The film grossed HK$2,716,494 at the Hong Kong box office during its theatrical run from 12 to 26 April 1979 in Hong Kong.

References

External links

The Deadly Breaking Sword at Hong Kong Cinemagic

1979 films
1979 martial arts films
1970s action comedy films
1970s martial arts comedy films
Hong Kong action comedy films
Wuxia films
Hong Kong martial arts comedy films
1970s Mandarin-language films
Shaw Brothers Studio films
Films shot in Hong Kong
1970s Hong Kong films